The Bhutia Boarding School in Darjeeling is a school founded in 1874. Its first director was Sarat Chandra Das and Professor of Tibetan Ugyen Gyatso, a monk of Tibeto- Sikkimese origin. It was opened by order of the Lieutenant Governor of British Bengal, Sir George Campbell. Its purpose was to provide education to young Tibetans and Sikkimese boys resident in Sikkim or the Darjeeling area.
However, according to Derek Wallers, it aimed to train interpreters, geographers and explorers may be useful in the event of an opening of Tibet to the English. Students learnt English, Tibetan and topography. In 1879, Sarat Chandra Das, sometimes disguised as a Tibetan lama, sometimes as a merchant from Nepal and Ugyen Gyatso made several trips to Tibet as secret agents of British India services in order to establish and collect cards.

The opening coincided with the school 's educational initiatives William Macfarlane, a Scottish missionary in the region. If there was no link between these two initiatives, there was also no tension between them, sharing the same goals and methods with mutual benefit.

In 1891, the boarding school merged with the Darjeeling Zilla School to form the Darjeeling High School.

Bhutia Boarding School 
 Kazi Dawa Samdup
 David Macdonald, (1870-1962)

Darjeeling High School 
 Norbu Dhondup, (1884-1944)
 Pemba Tsering, (1905-1954)
 Ekai Kawaguchi
 Karma Sumdhon Paul (alias Karma Babu). He later became director of the school.

References

Education in Darjeeling
Education in Tibet
Educational institutions established in 1874
1874 establishments in China